Mitch Stewart is an American football coach and former player. He is currently the offensive coordinator at Middle Tennessee and was previously the offensive coordinator and wide receivers coach at Samford. He was the head football coach at Murray State University in Murray, Kentucky, a position he held from 2015 until 2019. Stewart played college football as a quarterback at Valdosta State University in Valdosta, Georgia

Head coaching record

References

External links
 Murray State profile

Living people
American football quarterbacks
Georgia Southern Eagles football coaches
Murray State Racers football coaches
Valdosta State Blazers football players
High school football coaches in Georgia (U.S. state)
1982 births